Pop! Goes the Country is a weekly half-hour syndicated variety country music television series that originally aired from September 7, 1974 through 1982 for a total of 234 episodes. Originally hosted by Ralph Emery, the series was recorded at the Grand Ole Opry House and featured comedy sketches, performances by and interviews with country music singers, both established celebrities and up and coming singers and musicians. In 1980, Tom T. Hall replaced Emery as the host. In the final year of the series, comedian Jim Varney became a member of the cast, and the show moved from the Opry House to Opryland USA's Gaslight Theater. It is also considered as a spin-off of The Porter Wagoner Show. The Statler Brothers sang the show's original theme song.

The series' title referenced the influence pop music was having on country music at the time on artists such as Barbara Mandrell, Lynn Anderson, Dolly Parton, and Anne Murray, all of whom appeared as guests on the program, although performers with more traditional styles such as Loretta Lynn, Merle Haggard, and Mel Tillis were also featured during the show's run.

As of December 2014, the show is being rebroadcast on the cable network RFD-TV.

References

External links
 
 Episode list at thetvdb.com

1974 American television series debuts
1982 American television series endings
1970s American variety television series
1980s American variety television series
First-run syndicated television programs in the United States
American country music
Grand Ole Opry
Culture of Nashville, Tennessee
Country music television series